The Strada statale 131 Diramazione Centrale Nuorese, is a dual carriageway located in Sardinia, Italy.

This freeway is connected to the Strada statale 131 Charles Felix, it links Abbasanta (a village near Oristano) with Olbia, via Nuoro, crossing the hinterland mountainous regions of the island.
It has a length of 148 km.

See also
 Strada statale 131 Charles Felix

Transport in Sardinia
131dcn